Cumbia Ninja is a Colombian supernatural, mystery-thriller television series created for Fox by Andrés Gelós and produced by Nelson Martínez and María Gowland. The series premiered on Fox on September 5, 2013, and the first season concluded on November 13, 2013. In January 2014, Fox renewed the series for a second season which aired from October 2, 2014. The series is produced by Fox Networks Group and Fox Telecolombia.

Series overview 

{| class="wikitable plainrowheaders" style="text-align:center;"
|-
! scope="col" colspan="2" rowspan="2" style="padding: 0px 8px" |Series
! scope="col" rowspan="2" style="padding: 0px 8px" |Episodes
! scope="col" colspan="2" style="padding: 1px 8px" |Originally aired
|-
! scope="col" style="padding: 1px 8px" | Series premiere
! scope="col" style="padding: 1px 8px" | Series finale
|-
| scope="row" bgcolor="#004FC5" height="10px"| 
| [[List of H2O: Just Add Water episodes#Series one (2006)|1]]
| 13
| 
| 
|-
| scope="row" bgcolor="#00AAFF" height="10px"| 
| [[List of H2O: Just Add Water episodes#Series two (2007–08)|2]]
| 16
| 
| 
|-
| scope="row" bgcolor="#00FFFF" height="10px"| 
| [[List of H2O: Just Add Water episodes#Series three (2009–10)|3]]
| 16
|  
|  
|}

Episodes

Season 1 (2013)

References

External links

Lists of Colombian drama television series episodes